Election of the Speaker of the Chamber of Deputies of the Parliament of the Czech Republic was held on 27 November 2013. Jan Hamáček was elected the new Speaker. Hamáček was the nominee of Czech Social Democratic Party but received support from other coalition parties - ANO 2011, Christian and Democratic Union – Czechoslovak People's Party. Civic Democratic Party (Czech Republic) and TOP 09 also gave him an endorsement. Hamáček is the youngest Speaker of the Chamber.

Voting
Voting took place on 27 November 2013. Hamáček was the only candidate. He received 195 votes of 198 and became the new Speaker. The incumbent speaker, Miroslava Němcová, did not seek reelection. She sought position of vice-chairwoman instead but was unsuccessful.

References

Speaker of the Chamber of Deputies of the Parliament of the Czech Republic election
2013
Speaker of the Chamber of Deputies of the Parliament of the Czech Republic election
Speaker of the Chamber of Deputies of the Parliament of the Czech Republic election